The Handan East railway station is a station on the Beijing–Guangzhou–Shenzhen–Hong Kong High-Speed Railway located in Handan, Hebei.

History
The station was opened on 26 December 2012, together with the Beijing-Zhengzhou section of the Beijing–Guangzhou–Shenzhen–Hong Kong High-Speed Railway.

References

Railway stations in Hebei
Stations on the Beijing–Guangzhou–Shenzhen–Hong Kong High-Speed Railway
Handan
Railway stations in China opened in 2012